Kampong Sengkurong is a village in the west of Brunei-Muara District, Brunei. The total population was 5,003 in 2016.

Geography 
Kampong Sengkurong is one of the villages along Jalan Tutong, a primary road which links the capital Bandar Seri Begawan to Pekan Tutong, the town of Tutong District.

Administration 
For administrative purposes the village has been divided into, and established as, two village subdivisions:

Both are villages within Mukim Sengkurong.

Economy 
The village contains a commercial area. It is one of the few outside Bandar Seri Begawan and within Brunei-Muara District. The commercial area comprises rows of shophouses, mainly clustered in the vicinity of the intersection between Jalan Tutong and Jalan Jerudong.

Facilities 
Sengkurong Primary School is the village's government primary school. It also shares grounds with Sengkurong Religious School, the village's government school for the country's Islamic religious primary education.

Sultan Sharif Ali Mosque serves Kampong Sengkurong as well as the surrounding villages. It was inaugurated by Sultan Hassanal Bolkiah on 28 February 1986. The mosque can accommodate 3,000 worshippers.

Other facilities located in the village include:
 Sengkurong Library
 Sengkurong Post Office
 Sengkurong Police Station

See also 
 Jerudong

Notes

References 

Sengkurong